Rupt-sur-Othain (literally Rupt on Othain) is a commune in the Meuse department in Grand Est in north-eastern France.

Geography
The village lies on the left bank of the Othain, which forms most of the commune's north-eastern border.

See also
Communes of the Meuse department

References

Ruptsurothain